Chirnside Park Shopping Centre is a suburban  shopping centre, located in Chirnside Park, Melbourne, Australia and is owned by GPT Wholesale Shopping Centre Fund. It is situated approximately 32 kilometres east-north-east of the Melbourne CBD. The shopping centre opened in 1979 as a small convenience shopping centre which has grown over the years, opening retailers such as SpecSavers, Kmart, Target, Woolworths, Coles, Aldi, Chemist Warehouse and Reading Cinemas.

History
Chirnside Park Shopping Centre opened June 1979 as a mini convenience store including Safeway, the centre was owned by the council from 1979–1999, after which the centre was sold to company Lend Lease Corporation, who owned the centre from 2000–2006, while building a cinema and new shops. From 2007 The GPT Group took over.

References

External links
 
 GPT Retail Portfolio

Shopping centres in Melbourne
Shopping malls established in 1979
Buildings and structures in the Shire of Yarra Ranges
1979 establishments in Australia